Mars was a 64-gun third-rate ship of the line of the French Navy. She was taken into Royal Navy service as HMS Mars and was wrecked in 1755 near Halifax, Nova Scotia.

French service
Le Mars was captured by HMS Nottingham, under Philip Saumarez, off Cape Clear, off Ireland in 1746.

British service
Commissioned in March 1747, under the command of Captain Edward Hawke.

Francis Light, founder of Penang, began his Royal Navy service as a surgeon's servant on Mars in February 1754.

While on a voyage from Portsmouth, England to Louisbourg, Nova Scotia, she was wrecked on 25 June 1755 on a rock (now known as Mars Rock) near Halifax Harbour.

References

Further reading
 
  (1671–1870)

External links
 

1740 ships
Ships of the line of the French Navy
Maritime incidents in 1746
Maritime incidents in 1755